The Twenty-Fourth Canadian Ministry was the cabinet chaired by Prime Minister Brian Mulroney.  It governed Canada from 17 September 1984 to 25 June 1993, including the 33rd Canadian Parliament and most of the 34th.  The government was formed by the Progressive Conservative Party of Canada.

Ministers

References

Succession

24
Ministries of Elizabeth II
Ministry
1984 establishments in Canada
1993 disestablishments in Canada
Cabinets established in 1984
Cabinets disestablished in 1993